The Grand-Ducal Saxon Art School, Weimar (German:Großherzoglich-Sächsische Kunstschule Weimar) was founded on 1 October 1860, in Weimar, Germany, by a decree of Charles Alexander, Grand Duke of Saxe-Weimar-Eisenach. It existed until 1910, when it merged with several other art schools to become the Großherzoglich Sächsische Hochschule für Bildende Kunst ("Grand-Ducal Saxon School for Fine Arts"). It should not be confused with the Weimar Princely Free Drawing School, which existed from 1776 to 1930 and, after 1860, served as a preparatory school.

History
From 1870 to 1900, the students and teachers of the school turned away from the academic tradition of idealized compositions. Inspired by the Barbizon School, they went directly to nature for their inspiration, in genre as well as landscape painting. This approach set the school apart and attracted attention throughout Europe.

Grand-Ducal Saxon School for Fine Arts, Weimar
In 1910, William Ernest, Grand Duke of Saxe-Weimar-Eisenach, in cooperation with Hans Olde (Director of the Art School), Adolf Brütt (Director of the Sculpture School) and Henry van de Velde (Director of the School of Arts & Crafts), joined the three schools to create the Großherzoglich Sächsische Hochschule für Bildende Kunst ("Grand-Ducal Saxon School for Fine Arts"), headed by Fritz Mackensen.

Building 

The Art Nouveau art school building, designed by Henry van de Velde, was built between 1904 and 1911.  Of particular note in the building's interior are the  Oberlichtsaal (skylight hall), the elliptical staircase and the statue of Eve by Auguste Rodin. From 1919-1925 this building, and the neighbouring former Grand-Ducal Saxon School of Arts and Crafts building (built 1905-1906), also designed by van de Velde, were used by the Bauhaus art school, which was founded by Walter Gropius.

In 1996 both van de Velde buildings on the site, which are now used by the Bauhaus University Weimar, were included as part of the Bauhaus and its Sites in Weimar, Dessau and Bernau World Heritage site.

Associated people

Directors and lecturers

By date of appointment.

Notable students

 Carl Arp, Hans Arp, Paul Baum, Max Beckmann, Ella Bergmann-Michel, Ferdinand Brütt, Karl Buchholz, Julius Victor Carstens, Paul Eduard Crodel, Hans Delbrück, Mathilde Freiin von Freytag-Loringhoven, Ludwig von Gleichen-Rußwurm, Karl Gussow, August Haake, Wilhelm Hasemann, Rudolf Höckner, Otto Illies, Leopold Graf von Kalckreuth, Otto von Kameke, Max Liebermann, Carl Malchin, Carlo Mense, Alexander Olbricht, Otto Piltz, Leon Pohle, Harriet von Rathlef-Keilmann, Adolf Rettelbusch, Carl Rodeck, Christian Rohlfs, Paul Thumann, Minna Beckmann-Tube, Eduard Weichberger, Adolf Ziegler, Irma Stern

Bibliography
 Walther Scheidig: Die Weimarer Malerschule. Seemann, Leipzig 1991, .
 Hendrik Ziegler: Die Kunst der Weimarer Malerschule. Von der Pleinairmalerei zum Impressionismus. Böhlau, Köln, Weimar, Wien 2001, .
 Gerda Wendemann et al.: Hinaus in die Natur: Barbizon, die Weimarer Malerschule und der Aufbruch zum Impressionismus. Christoph Kerber Verlag, Bielefeld 2010, .
 Jutta Hülsewig-Johnen, Thomas Kellein: Der Deutsche Impressionismus. DuMont-Buchverlag, Köln 2009, . 
 Renate Müller-Krumbach, Karl Schawelka, Norbert Korrek, Gerwin Zohlen: Die Belebung des Stoffes durch die Form. Van de Veldes Hochschulbau in Weimar. Verlag der Bauhaus-Universität Weimar, Weimar 2002, .
 Silke Opitz (Hrsg.): Van de Veldes Kunstschulbauten in Weimar. Architektur und Ausstattung. Verlag der Bauhaus-Universität Weimar, Weimar 2004, .
 Michael Eckhardt (Hrsg.): Bauhaus-Spaziergang. In Weimar unterwegs auf den Spuren des frühen Bauhauses. Verlag der Bauhaus-Universität Weimar, Weimar 2009, .
 Frank Simon-Ritz, Klaus-Jürgen Winkler, Gerd Zimmermann (Hrsg.): Aber wir sind! Wir wollen! Und wir schaffen! Von der Großherzoglichen Kunstschule zur Bauhaus-Universität.  Verlag der Bauhaus-Universität Weimar, Weimar 2010, .
 Schlenker, Sabine (2007): Mit dem Talent der Augen. Der Kunstkritiker Emil Heilbut (1861-1921) Ein Streiter für die moderne Kunst im Deutschen Kaiserreich, VDG-Verlag Weimar, .
 Müllerschön, Bernd und Maier, Thomas (2002): Die Maler der Schule von Barbizon – Wegbereiter des Impressionismus, Ed. Thombe, .
 Stapf, Peter (2014): Der Maler Max Thedy 1858–1924, Böhlau Verlag Köln∙Weimar∙Wien, .
Fuß, Rowena (2013): Christian Rohlfs in Weimar: Das Frühwerk: 1870-1901 (Vorreiter ohne Vorbild), VDG-Verlag Weimar, .
 Plaul, Jens M. (2009): Max Oehler: Auf den Spuren eines Landschaftsmalers in Nachfolge der Weimarer Malerschule, 2. Auflage, Arbeitskreis Stadtgeschichte Blankenhain, 
 Merseburger, Peter (2013): Mythos Weimar: Zwischen Geist und Macht, Pantheon Verlag München, .
Häder, Ulf (1999): Der Jungbrunnen für die Malerei, Holland und die deutsche Kunst 1850–1900, page 168–171 and 286. Jena.
 Mai, Ekkehard (2010): Die Deutschen Kunstakademien im 19. Jahrhundert, Künstlerausbildung zwischen Tradition und Avantgarde, Böhlau Verlag Köln Weimar Wien, .
 Whitford, Frank (1984): Bauhaus (World of Art), Thames and Hudson Ltd., London, 
 Seemann, E.A. (2000): Karl Buchholz, 1849-1889: Ein Künstler der Weimarer Malerschule, Seemann-Verlag, .
 Dauer, Horst (1983): Die Weimarer Malerschule, Leipzig, Seemann-Verlag, ASIN B0026OK8UA.
Deshmukh, Marion F. (2015): Max Liebermann Modern Art and Modern Germany, Ashgate Farnham, .

References

External links

 Virtual tour of the main art school building

1860 establishments in Germany
Art schools in Germany
Henry van de Velde buildings
Art Nouveau architecture in Germany
Art Nouveau educational buildings
Education in Weimar
Bauhaus University, Weimar